Wiktor Tołkin (February 21, 1922 in Tołkacze, Poland – May 7, 2013) was a Polish sculptor and architect. A member of the Armia Krajowa resistance during World War II; he was arrested by the Gestapo, and incarcerated at Auschwitz from November 17, 1942 to February 1944. During this period Tołkin survived a death march to Stalag at Sandbostel.

Work
Tołkin graduated from two universities, the Gdańsk Polytechnic, and the Academy of Fine Arts in Gdańsk, to become one of the more influential Polish artists of the 1960s. He is best known for his monumental sculptures built in memory of the victims of the German concentration camps in Stutthof and Majdanek. His most recognized works are abstract forms of colored concrete with expressive form, incorporating architectural design and elements.

Leading works 
 Monument The Marrying of Poland with the Sea in Kolobrzeg, built November 30, 1963.
 Monument  Fight and Martyrdom in the Nazi concentration camp in Stutthof, built May 12, 1968.
 Monument Fight and Martyrdom and the mausoleum-pantheon in the Nazi concentration camp in Majdanek, built in 1969.
 Fight and Martyrdom in Pawiak, Warsaw.
 Monument to the Battle of in Plock, (1978)

References

Bibliography 
Pomnik Ofiar Majdanka
 Kto jest kim w Polsce, edycja IV (zespół redakcyjny Beata Cynkier i inni), Warszawa 2001, s. 970–971

1922 births
2013 deaths
20th-century Polish architects
Polish sculptors
Polish male sculptors
20th-century Polish male artists
Academy of Fine Arts in Gdańsk alumni